Ralph James "Happy" Sivell (March 12, 1914March 16, 1997) was a professional American football guard in the National Football League (NFL) and the All-America Football Conference (AAFC). He played for the NFL's Brooklyn Dodgers/Tigers (1938–1942, 1944) and New York Giants (1944–1945) and the AAFC's Miami Seahawks (1946).

1914 births
1997 deaths
People from Pine Mountain, Harris County, Georgia
Sportspeople from the Atlanta metropolitan area
Players of American football from Georgia (U.S. state)
American football offensive guards
Auburn Tigers football players
Brooklyn Dodgers (NFL) players
Brooklyn Tigers players
New York Giants players
Miami Seahawks players